National Treasure is a 2017 Chinese cultural exploration variety TV program that aired on CCTV-3 and CCTV-1 in China. The TV program is produced by Lǚ Yitao. Actor Zhang Guoli serves as the host. The Palace Museum, Shanghai Museum, Nanjing Museum, Hunan Provincial Museum, Henan Museum, Shaanxi History Museum, Hubei Provincial Museum, Zhejiang Provincial Museum and Liaoning Provincial Museum, the nine major museums in mainland China, each presented three national treasures across the episodes. Each treasure in the TV program will be presented by national treasure keepers performed by celebrities and common people, to tell the stories of national treasures with the collections, interpreting the historical mystery.

Synopsis

Music
 One Eye for a Thousand Years, sung by Na Ying.

Reception
The TV program received mainly positive reviews. On Douban, the TV program has a score of 94 out of 100.

It won Best Variety Program (Seasonal) at 24th Shanghai Television Festival.

References

External links
 
 

Chinese-language television shows
2017 Chinese television series debuts
Chinese documentary television series